A Virtuous Woman is a novel by Kaye Gibbons. It was chosen as an Oprah's Book Club selection in October 1997.

1989 American novels